The Canadian Curling Hall of Fame was established with its first inductees in 1973. It is operated by Curling Canada, the governing body for curling in Canada, in Orleans, Ontario.

The Hall of Fame selection committee meets annually to choose inductees from four categories: curler, builder, curler/builder and team. Past presidents of the Curling Canada are automatically inducted into the Hall of Fame as part of the Executive Honour Roll.

Members

A-F

Diane Adams
Don Aitken
J. W. Allan
Lorraine Ambrosio
A. F. Anderson
A. F. Angus
Ron Anton
Horace F. Argue
James Armstrong
Jim Armstrong
Janet Arnott
Mary-Anne Arsenault
Laurie Artiss
Henri Auger
Frank Avery
Hugh Avery
Norm Balderston
Matt Baldwin
Caroline Ball
Marilyn Barraclough
Sue Ann Bartlett
David Beesley
Terry Begin
Tim Belcourt
Gordon Bennett
Morag Bergasse
Jan Betker
Marilyn Bodogh
Henry Bruce Boreham
Earl Bourne
Jack Boutilier
Jack Bowman
Bert Boyd
Cec Boyd
Earl Boyd
Ralph Boyd

Shirley Bray
Brier Bear (Reg Coughie)
Fred Britton
Michael Burns Sr.
Noel Buxton
Ada Calles
Bert Cameron
Doug Cameron
George Cameron
Colin Campbell
Garnet Campbell
Glen Campbell
Gloria Campbell
Gordon Campbell
Maurice Campbell
Thane Campbell
Kent Carstairs
Harry Carter
Brian Cassidy
Agnès Charette
Pierre Charette
Kathleen Clift
James Congalton
George Cooke
Edith Corby-Moore
Resby Coutts
Walter B. Cowan
Pauline M. Cragg
Gordon Craig
Robert Cream
Elsie Crosby
Edward M. "Ted" Culliton
D. William "Bill" Currie
Lyall Dagg
Keith Deacon

Nancy Delahunt
Noreen Delisle
Al R. Delmage
Mabel M. DeWare
Catherine Dillon
George V. Dillon
Robert F. Dillon
Marion Dockendroff
James E. Donahoe
Richard A. Donahoe
Donna Duffett
Donald G. "Don" Duguid
Anne Dunn
John Dutton
Patricia "Trish" Dwyer
Jessie Elliott
Irl England
Millard Evans
Emily Farnham
Sylvia Fedoruk
Randy Ferbey
John W. "Fergie" Ferguson
André Ferland
Thomas R. Fisher
Don Fleming
Richard D. "Rick" Folk
Anita Ford
Atina Ford
Ina Forrest
Al Forsythe
H. C. "Ren" Fortier
Barbara Foster
Gordon G. "Gordie" Fox

G-L

William Gatchell
Sonja Gaudet 
Cathy Gauthier
Regi Geary
Maymar Gemmell
Hector J. Gervais
Bill Good Sr.
Edwin Gooder
Peter Gow
Albert "Ab" Gowanlock
William A. Grant
Thomas Gray
Barry Greenberg
Jill Greenwood
Marcia Gudereit
John Gunn
Lloyd H. Gunnlaugson
Joseph A. Gurowka
Al Hackner
John Haig
Perry Hall
Ina Hansen
Warren Hansen
Scotty Harper
Bill Harris
Dawn Harris (Knowles)
Les Harrison
Neil Harrison
Ross G. L. Harstone

Gordon J. Haynes
Bob Heartwell
Ann Hebb
Leo Hebert
Darlene Hill
Walter Hobbs
Gordon Hooey
Heather E. Houston
Neil W. "Woody" Houston
Glenn W. "Howie" Howard
Russell W. "Russ" Howard
Gordon M. Hudson
Günther Hummelt
Roderick G. M. "Rod" Hunter
Ron Hutton
Peter Inch
Niven M. Jackson
Hazel I. Jamison
"Shorty" Jenkins
Clara Johnson
Leo Johnson
Katherine Johnston
Colleen P. Jones
Terry Jones (2019)
Deborah "Debbie" Jones-Walker
Christine Jurgenson
June Kaufman
John W. Kawaja
Rae Kells (2019)
Kim Kelly
Bruce Kennedy
Tracy Kennedy
Eva Kerr

F. Marjorie Kerr
Nancy Kerr
John Keys
Cathy King
Raymond A. "Ray" Kingsmith
Sharon Knox
Irene Konkin
F. Evelyn "Ev" Krahn
Connie Laliberte
Arthur Lamb
Lorraine Lang
Richard P. "Rick" Lang
Allan D. Langlois
Penny LaRocque
Vicki Lauder
Wendy Leach
William Leaman
Don Lewis
Ina C. Light
Betty Linkletter
Shirley Little
Art Lobel
Laura Lochanski
William Low
Frederick J. Lucas
Ed Lukowich
William E. "Bill" Lumsden
Peter Lyall
Velma M. Lytle

M-R

Harold L. Mabey Sr.
Elizabeth "Liz" MacDonald
Wendell L. MacDonald
Alan N. MacGowan
Joseph Alfred MacInnes
Elbridge P. MacKay
William J. MacKay
Donald J. "Don" MacKenzie
Daniel MacKinnon
Aileen MacLean
Donald R. MacLeod
Mary MacMurray
Murray MacNeill
Dorothy "Dot" MacRea
W. J. Magrath
John S. Malcolm
Harvey Malo
Cliff Manahan
Hadie Manley
Lindy Marchuk
Flora Martin
Kevin Martin
J. B. Mather
Jack Matheson
Douglas D. Maxwell
Harvey G. Mazinke
J. B. McArthur
Joan McCusker
Cameron McEwen
Thomas McGaw
Doug "Buzz" McGibney
Larry McGrath
Joyce McKee
Shirley McKendry
Ken McLean
Lura McLuckie
Burd McNeice
Andrew McWilliams
Janet Merry
Edna "Ed" Messum
Olive Mews
Wayne Middaugh
Maureen Miller
Herbert C. "Herb" Millham
Ronald A. Mills
Marj Mitchell
Lorne Mitton
Linda Moore
Shirley Morash
Christine M. More
Earle Morris
Lenore "Lee" Morrison
John Moss
Clifford A. L. Murchison
Jerry J. Muzika
Joyce Myers
Barry Naimark
Darryl Neighbour
Marilyn Neily
R. Bruce Ness
Dorothy New
Mary-Anne Nicholson
Bob Nicol
George Norgan
Ronald C. Northcott
J. Frank "OB" O'Brien
Stanley Oleson
Albert Olson
L. E. "Bud" Olson
Ole Olson
Clyde R. Opaleychuk
Anne Orser

Cathy Overton-Clapham
Jules Owchar (2019)
William Parish
Dave Parkes (2019)
Albert Parkhill
James G. "Ted" Pattee
Pat Perroud
Charles Perry
Don Petlak
James K. Pettapiece
David Petursson (2019)
Vera Pezer
Bob Picken
Bob Pickering
William Piercey
Peggy Piers
Violet Pike
Ernest Pollard
Muriel Porter
Rita C. Proulx
Graham Prouse
H. Fielding Rankine
Vic Rauter
Patricia Ray
Thomas H. Rennie
Arnold W. Richardson
Carleton Richardson
Ernie Richardson
"Sam" Richardson
Wesley H. "Wes" Richardson
Norman P. Rockwell
Barbara Roper
Samuel "Sam" Rothschild
Sheila Rowan
Marion "Doodle" Rowlands
Adeline Roy
Patrick J. C. "Pat" Ryan

S-Z

Olivier Samson
Pat Sanders
Zivan Saper
Frank F. Sargent
Paul Savage
Sandra Schmirler
Mabel Dalton Segsworth
Jerry Shoemaker
John A. Sinclair
Marjorie H. Sinclair
Ronald Singbusch
F. Arthur "Art" Skinner
Julie Skinner
James Smart
David C. "Dave" Smith
Sir Donald Smith
Emmett Smith
Yvonne Smith
Jean Snowdon
Bernie Sparkes
Lindsay E. Sparkes (Davie)
John D. Squarebriggs
Edward O. "Ed" Steeves
Frank M. Stent
A. E. Stephenson
David Macdonald Stewart
T. Howard Stewart
Walter Stewart
Reginald E. Stone
Roy Stone

Frederick L. "Fred" Storey
Toro Suzuki
Brent A. Syme
A. Ross Tarlton
Ian Tetley
Nick Thibodeau
Dennis Thiessen  
Cliff Thompson
Dorothy Thompson
T. Gordon Thompson
Ted Thonger
Edith Tipping
Lee Tobin
Fran Todd
Gerry Tomalty
Richard T. "Dick" Topping
Clif Torey
William R. "Bill" Tracy
Thomas Travers
Evan Trites
Raymond C. "Ray" Turnbull
Thora Turner
James Tyre
James W. Ursel
Wally Ursuliak
Margaret E. Valentine
Patti Vandekerckhove
Judith Veinot
Donald J. "Don" Walchuk
David Walker
Jo Wallace

William J. "Billy" Walsh
Cy Walters
Grant Watson
Islay "Ila" Watson
Ken Watson
Cecil Watt
Hazel Watt
Horace P. Webb
Bob Weeks
Kenneth B. Weldon
Jack Wells
Jimmy Welsh
Edward "Ed" Werenich
Hugh E. "Jim" Weyman
C. E. Joan Whalley
Elma-Mae Whitehead
Twyla Widdifield
Errick F. Willis
Archibald E. Wilson
Jim Wilson
Robin Wilson
Tom Wilson
Marvin Wirth
Don Wittman
Bryan Wood
Daniel John Howard "Pappy" Wood Sr.
Larry Wood
Nora Wood
Emily Woolley
Muriel Youngson

References

External links
Canadian Curling Hall of Fame

Curling in Canada
Halls of fame in Canada
Sports halls of fame
Canadian sports trophies and awards
Awards established in 1973
Curling trophies and awards